The Adventuress of Monte Carlo is a 1921 German silent adventure film directed by Adolf Gärtner and starring Ellen Richter, Anton Pointner and Eduard von Winterstein. It was released in three parts, The Mistress of the Shah, Moroccan Nights and The Stanley Trial.

The film's sets were designed by the art director Hans Dreier. Extensive location shooting took place in Monte Carlo, Morocco, Paris, Nice, Switzerland, Barcelona and Italy.

Cast
Ellen Richter as Zoraja
Anton Pointner as Edward Stanley
Albert Patry as De Jong
Eduard von Winterstein as Rimay
Charles Puffy as Ali, servant
Kurt Rottenburg as Thiery
Karl Günther as Prinz Luigi
Karl Swoboda as Prokurist
Martha Hoffmann as stewardess
Toni Tetzlaff as Madame X
Albert Paulig as Oberkellner
Henry Bender as Achmed
Magnus Stifter as Ibrahim
Hamed ben Melusi as Ali ben Rassid
Max Kronert as Nyhoff
Paul Biensfeldt as Moroccan Postbeamter
Arthur Kraußneck as Untersuchungsrichter
Adolf Klein as chief judge
Robert Forster-Larrinaga as defense lawyer
Karl Harbacher as first court usher
Hugo Hummel as second court usher

References

External links

1921 films
Films of the Weimar Republic
German silent feature films
Films directed by Adolf Gärtner
German black-and-white films
1921 adventure films
German adventure films
UFA GmbH films
Silent adventure films
1920s German films
1920s German-language films